The Tracey Ullman Show is an American television variety show starring Tracey Ullman. It debuted on Fox on April 5, 1987, the network's second original primetime series to air following Married... with Children, and ran until May 26, 1990. The show was produced by Gracie Films. The show blended sketch comedy with musical numbers and dance routines, choreographed by Paula Abdul, along with animated shorts. The format was conceived by creator and executive producer James L. Brooks, who was looking to showcase the show's multitalented star. Brooks likened the show to producing three pilots a week. Ullman was the first British woman to be offered her own television sketch show in both the United Kingdom and the United States.

The show is also known for producing a series of shorts featuring the Simpson family, which was later adapted into the longest-running American scripted primetime television series, The Simpsons. The Tracey Ullman Show was the first Fox primetime show to win an Emmy Award, winning a total of 10 over its run.

Rolling Stone ranked The Tracey Ullman Show as the 25th-best sketch comedy show in its "40 Greatest Sketch-Comedy TV Shows of All Time" list.

Development
British actress, comedian, singer and former dancer Tracey Ullman was encouraged to try to break into American television by her husband, British producer Allan McKeown, who was looking to station himself in the United States. Ullman, who was already a household name in her native England, had already been making the rounds in the US promoting her film and music career in the early 1980s. Unlike in England, Americans were not aware of her comedy background outside of humorous appearances on The Tonight Show Starring Johnny Carson and Late Night with David Letterman. Ullman already had three British comedies under her belt, garnering her awards and accolades. "I didn't believe there was anything above Webster standard [in America]. I was wrong." Her British agent put together a compilation of her work and began circulating it around Hollywood. Her tape landed in the lap of Craig Kellem, vice president of comedy at Universal Television. "I could not believe my eyes. It was just about the most extraordinary piece of material I'd seen in a long time." He wanted production on a series to begin immediately for her. Saturday Night Live scribe and creator of CBS's Square Pegs, Anne Beatts was hired to write the pilot. Universal liked the script; Ullman reportedly threw her hands up in the air, hating it. Recalling the project: "We'd just hit on an idea, then some white-haired executive – very, very important – would come in from the race track and say, 'I don't like that idea. I think Tracey should be a caring person. I think there should be a kid in this. Now, I'm just pitching here. I don't know if this is funny. But I think Tracey should love this kid and maybe there's a moment where she tells the kid something about life.' And I'd say, "Look – I don't want to work with little kids being cute who I eventually adopt'."

Ullman's new agent, Martha Luttrell sent her tape to James L. Brooks, who had a deal with Fox. Fox, dubbed America's "fourth network", was looking to create its own brand of original primetime programming. Brooks was bowled over by Ullman's material. "I saw original talent, and how often does that happen to you?" "I started showing [her work] to people like you'd show home movies." "I was just startled by the size of the talent. I got chills." Ullman explained to Brooks her situation at CBS and the fact that she was now pregnant. Brooks convinced her to get out of the CBS deal, and after she had her baby, they would do a show together. Brooks felt that a sketch show would best suit her assets (acting, singing, and dancing). "Why would you do something with Tracey playing a single character on TV when her talent requires variety? You can't categorize Tracey, so it's silly to come up with a show that attempted to."

To ensure that she was well-versed in American comedy, Brooks began sending her tapes of American sitcoms and variety shows to watch and study. Ullman also began visiting and spending time at the Museum of Television & Radio.

"After I made [the 1985 film] Plenty, I thought it was sad that everyone left London to go home to Hollywood. Thought I'd join 'em. [...] I thought of myself as a Peter Sellers type. No one does American accents better than him. Look at Dr. Strangelove and Lolita". As one critic noted, Sellars had American director Stanley Kubrick as his visionary and Ullman would get American television and film director James L. Brooks, the man behind such hit television shows as The Mary Tyler Moore Show, Taxi, and Rhoda, and the films Terms of Endearment and Broadcast News. "I came to America in 1985 and James made me stay. If I had a mentor like him in Great Britain, I would've stayed there."

"Variety hadn't been done for sometime and we wanted to do a show that would allow me to do the things I like to do and can do," stated Ullman in 1987. "I think, literally, the word unique and mean it," said  Brooks in regards to Ullman's talent. "We're so obsessed with comparisons. The only one I could even think of that comparing her to is Peter Sellers – he's the only one you can mention. He could do a variety of Americans. And then you have to add that Tracey sings and dances."

The key to getting Ullman ready for primetime was "assembling the right people" according to Brooks. Brooks, along with co-executive  Jerry Belson, Ken Estin, and Heide Perlman, went on a retreat in Northern California to think through the show. "We wanted to tell a story, to be involved in character. We did not want to do spoofs or takeoffs. You define a show by what you don't want want to do as well as by what you do. We rushed on the air and have been finding the show while we're on the air. You lose a lot of sleep that way, but it's great. Now, we have five or six characters that we repeat from time to time, and new ones are candidates for repetition." When it came to Fox, Brooks stated, "It was helpful for us to do the show without any preconceived context. Not only were we new, but so was Fox. There was no notion of something to fit into." Fox was reportedly backing the show with nearly $1,000,000 per broadcast. The series landed an initial 26-episode commitment deal, unheard of for a television comedy; Fox ordered a further 30 episodes in October 1987. Describing the show proved difficult; creator Ken Estin dubbed it a "skitcom".

An array of original and diverse characters was created for Ullman to perform. Extensive makeup, wigs, teeth, and body padding were used, sometimes rendering her completely unrecognizable. One original character created solely by Ullman back in Britain was uprooted for the show: long-suffering British spinster Kay Clark. Kay was based on a real woman who worked in a Midlands bank that Ullman kept in touch with long after leaving Britain for the United States. "Kay" would ask her about Hollywood on the telephone; Ullman would subsequently do the voice she heard on the other line to her dog. She had been obsessed with spinsters ever since she was a small child, and kept a mental file on them. She never saw "Kay" and imagined what she looked like. Tracey Ullman Show costume designer Jame Ruhm suggested a drooping bust and cellulite-covered hips for the character. Ruhm created a costume complete with "hydraulic pistons". "Tracey is really, really interested in what her characters look like," revealed Ruhm. "She is constantly going around collecting pictures of people and coming to me and saying, 'I want to do a character dressed like this!' I file that in my memory, and then we'll get a script and I'll say, 'That character that you wanted to do, can we use it on this?' She'll say, 'Yeah!' And we'll go." "It's a real thrill to me that someone like Kay can be famous in America." For other characters, she drew upon people she either knew or celebrities for inspiration. "I based one character on Maggie Smith, which the script supervisor suggested. I remember her in California Suite saying, 'Well, I don't care if I didn't win the fucking Oscar.'... It sounded good. It made me laugh, and then I felt that I could do the character." She based the character Francesca on a neighbor, an awkward teenaged girl, who would come to visit her in her kitchen and would sheepishly stand in the corner. "I wanted to portray painful adolescence, but not an adolescent that was spoiled. I'd seen so many that were just, 'Like I really want to go to the movies, and you're totally stupid.' I didn't want to play a horrible kid." Ullman believed in progressing the characters, adamant that they didn't stagnate. "You have to advance the characters [...] you have to find new situations for them [...] They have to do something or say something or grow as people. And they have to be unusual." Like Kay, another character created and performed by Ullman first for British television (Three of a Kind) and then adapted for the Fox show was impoverished housewife Betty Tomlinson.

Producers decided to add animated segments when they had trouble figuring out a way to end one sketch and go into the next. They had considered talking animals, specifically a talking bear. "I don't know why we were so into a bear," explained Ken Estin. "Nobody was in love with that idea, but we just couldn't think of how else to do it. In most variety shows, it was just sketches that were so short that they didn't have to worry about from going from one to the next. Nobody had ever really done this before." Estin was given with a drawing of Life in Hell by Matt Groening from Richard Sakai. "It was very different. It was smart. It was unusual. It was drawn poorly, which I thought added the charm [...] I said, 'What if we have this guy do these little cartoons in between the scenes? Is that possible? Does anybody like that idea?' They all said they liked the idea. This is how Matt ended up being our guy." James L. Brooks was also familiar with Groening's work. Polly Platt, producer of his film Terms of Endearment had given him a cartoon called "Success and Failure in Hollywood" drawn by Groening as a gift. Platt suggested that he do a special on the characters. Heide Perlman found another artist to do animated segments – M.K. Brown, who worked for National Lampoon. She agreed to do a cartoon based around a female psychiatrist, Dr. N!Godatu. Producers stopped hearing from Groening when Fox wanted to take over Life in Hell merchandising as part of his deal, resulting in his passing on the project. Estin asked Sakai to ask Groening if he had any characters that he would be willing to allow Fox to merchandise. Groening said that he did have other characters and would send them over for consideration. "Well, two, maybe three days after I spoke to Richard, Matt sends us a drawing of the Simpsons exactly as–well, not exactly–almost exactly as they are. Anyhow, everybody said, 'Fine. That's fine. We like them.' And Matt made his deal with Fox." Eventually, producers found that Groening's work suited the show better than Brown's and her segments were no longer used. Tracey Ullman was approached to do one of the voices of the Simpsons, but with her already spending up to three hours in the makeup chair, adding voice-over work was not feasible. Fellow cast member Julie Kavner then agreed to do it. Groening approached Ullman sporadically about doing a guest voice for the shorts, but with her heavy workload, she never had the time.

Early reports regarding the show's premise were: The focal point would be Ullman starring in one,  12-minute-long "playlet", a shorter sketch, some music, and a weekly lecture from Harry Shearer. The show would start with no pilot and a 26-episode commitment, and would be produced by Brooks along with some of the top writers from Cheers. Shearer's weekly lecture never materialized.

When the time came to go out and promote the show, Fox only allowed Ullman to tour Los Angeles and New York. In 1988, she insisted that she be allowed to tour Middle America. Never a fan of dialect coaches, this promotional tour would allow her to have ample opportunity to do some character study. "I want to see America a bit, I really do. I've only been to LA and New York, and they make very disparaging remarks about Middle America there. I mean, Des Moines, Iowa, is the place network executives always talk about, like, "Would they like this in Des Moines?' They think you just want Facts of Life and She's the Sheriff, that you really want that type of television, and I don't really believe that you do. There's no intelligence, no truth in anything like that. I think you want something a bit smarter. [...] We take pictures everywhere [on this promotional tour]; we're taping people's voices. I'm taking it all in, and it's great. Some journalist once said that I was a 'social satirist,' and I thought, 'That sounds quite intelligent, doesn't?' So that's what I'm doing, I'm meeting people from a social satirist's point of view." Whenever she was stuck on particular voice or accent, she would open a phone directory. "If I wanted to do somebody from Brooklyn, I would call the library in Brooklyn and listen to their voice and tape them surreptitiously so they didn't know." Also helping her in her quest for accents was the show's staff. When she had to find a Brooklyn accent distinctive from the Queens accent she used for her character, United States postal worker Tina, she had the show's staff make a long compilation tape of genuine Brooklyn accents (recordings from radio stations and even randomly placed phone calls placed to random Brooklynites). Ullman would also call car dealerships in different parts of the country pretending to be interested in buying a car just to hear how the people there spoke.

Production

Casting
Dan Castellaneta, a relative unknown, was asked to read for the show after he was spotted by Ullman at Chicago's The Second City. Castellaneta's portrayal of a blind man who wants to be a comedian brought her to tears instead of making her laugh. He gave up the opportunity to appear in the short-lived sitcom version of the film Nothing in Common in which he appeared so as to star in the Ullman show. "Tracey always says, 'You're so lucky, Dan. You can always go back to Nothing in Common," joked Castellaneta in a 1988 interview. Describing the show, Castellaneta stated, "Essentially what dictates it is that there are no parodies and even if it's an unusual situation, Tracey and (executive producer) Jim Brooks try to keep things as believable and real. You've got to be honest." He would continue to stay true to his Second City philosophy when playing comedy and characters. "Don't ever do what's expected. Always try to find a different way of doing something. ...Always play to the top of your intelligence. A character should be as smart as you are. And if the character isn't a smart as you are, you can't make a comment about it, you can't make fun of the character." Castellaneta felt that audiences could see right through a character that wasn't done honestly and that The Tracey Ullman Show'''s audience were both pretty demanding, as well as intelligent. "They're people who like something different, they're certainly an intelligent audience. And they're an audience that isn't as easily offended as other people might be." Actress Julie Kavner had co-starred in Brooks' spin-off series to The Mary Tyler Moore Show, Rhoda, starring Valerie Harper. Kavner played Harper's younger, socially awkward sister Brenda, a role for which she won an Emmy Award. Kavner was at the top of the list of people Brooks wanted to be part of the show. Brooks on Kavner: "When somebody's intrinsically funny – you know, in-their-bones funny – they never have to work at (being funny), so they're free to work on other things. We were all nuts about her work. She was the person we most wanted to work with Tracey." Actor Sam McMurray read for a guest spot on the show playing William, lover of 13-year-old valley girl Francesca's (Ullman) father. McMurray recalled his casting: "The first Francesca sketch, they said, 'Play the guy not so gay.' And I said 'I disagree.' I had a big mouth then -— still do. I said, 'I think he’s more the woman. I think he's more out there.' So I read and I read it big, and they cast me. It was just a one-off, and then we were on hiatus. I did the one week, and I had a friend coincidentally who used to write, a guy named Marc Flanagan, and he was on the show as a staff guy. He called me up and said, 'Did they call your agent?' I said, 'No, why?' He said, 'They wanna make you a regular.'" McMurray, who did not become a full-fledged cast member until the sixth episode, did not find himself feeling terribly comfortable at first with the show. McMurray: "[T]he social dynamic of the show is an odd one. I spoke with (executive producer) Jim Brooks about this later and I said, 'You know, it's like we're all square pegs, aren't we?' And he said, 'Yeah,' and that the same thing occurred on The Mary Tyler Moore Show. Everybody was from a different discipline on that show, – somebody had been from sitcoms, somebody came from the stage, and somebody had been a stand-up comic, and yet whatever the dynamic that was forged from it, it's singular and it works." The last to be cast was dancer Joseph Malone. He was originally hired for a guest shot– acting as a cop who also danced with a possible jumper on a ledge, which led to him becoming a series regular. He had worked with Michael Jackson, Lily Tomlin, and Barbara Mandrell. The show now had its cast. During the 1987–1988 season, Julie Kavner asked to be let out of her contract to be able to concentrate on making movies; Kavner had been living in New York while The Tracey Ullman Show taped in Los Angeles. Actress Anna Levine was subsequently cast, with Kavner putting in special appearances.

Writing
James L. Brooks knew the importance of good writers, and quickly assembled a team for the show, most notably, Heide Perlman and Ken Estin of Cheers fame. Estin also worked on Brooks's Taxi. The pair would also act as executive producers. Also joining the team was Jerry Belson; he also acted as executive producer. Belson had written for such television comedies as The Dick Van Dyke Show. Belson was the writer to whom Ullman warmed  immediately; he was always in her corner. In an interview with The Nerdist Podcast, she recalled Belson saying, "'Leave her alone, Jim, she's tired.' [...] He was one of those funny writers [who] if you said that you didn't like a joke in the room, he'd say, 'What is this, Nazi, Russia?'" When they won an Emmy, Belson's response was, "This is my first Emmy in color." Sam Simon, like Estin, wrote for Taxi, as well as executive produced the show. Brooks discovered writer Marc Flanagan after watching a piece performed by Meryl Streep and Kevin Klein at a benefit. He asked to speak to the writer and kept him in mind when he worked on the Ullman show as writer and producer. SCTV writers Dick Blasucci and Paul Flaherty wrote and co-produced as well.

For each show, a table read would take place on Monday mornings in the presence of writers and producers. Not unusually, rewrites could go past midnight. What worked in the writers room would sometimes fall flat once in the hands of the actors. The best readings were the result of numerous rewrites. "I love cracking a run-through," said Ullman in 1989. "It's like a drug. If I can get them looking at me and respecting me, and thinking, 'She's done it!' – it's the best feeling.'" But she knew that the only performance that truly counted was the final one recorded in front of a live studio audience. "You just gotta pray you hit that happy, energetic mood on Friday." The cast rehearsals would take place into lunch and dinner hours, usually under the tutelage of director Ted Bessell. Around 3:30 pm each day, writers and producers, led by  Brooks and Belson, would arrive for a run-through. They would observe, shout out suggestions, make additions and subtractions, and work out any kinks in the production. The show would then be ready to tape by Friday at 7:00 pm. One "writer" frequently credited on the show, Bonita Carlisle, was actually a nom de plume chosen by the writers' room indicating that the sketch had been a group effort. Guest stars such as Steve Martin and Mel Brooks also got heavily involved in their sketch's writing, as well.

While the Fox network was liberal when it came to the material it would allow the show to put on, by 1989, after controversy stemming from Married... with Children, the network's standards and practices department began monitoring the scripts and kowtowing to advocating groups. A sketch consisting of a nun (played by Ullman), a priest, and last rites was pulled midproduction. Producers were given the option of either watering down the skit or not doing it at all. Ullman had no problem with the piece. Brooks responded: "They're smart enough to know that they can't have a bland network that responds every pressure and be successful ... If we really believe a piece should be broadcast, then we will take a stand. We do care about doing characters accurately and in them taking a comic view of life, but when censorship interferes with that, we've got to scream."

Format
A typical episode of The Tracey Ullman Show consists of two or three sketches (or playlets) featuring Tracey Ullman playing an array of characters, along with her supporting cast of Julie Kavner, Dan Castellaneta, Sam McMurray, Joseph Malone, and in season three, Anna Levine. The final sketch of the night usually includes a musical or dance number featuring Ullman either solo or with other members of the cast. Paula Abdul was responsible for choreographing all of the show's dance routines. Interstitial cartoon shorts ("Dr. N!Godatu", "The Simpsons") were featured before and after each commercial break.

The show's producers toyed with the format during the show's first season. A variety act was added and then scrapped by the third episode. Ullman began opening the show as herself by episode five; this was dropped altogether by season three in favor of an elaborate opening title sequence.

The final segment of all four seasons has Ullman, clad in a pink robe, delivering a closing monologue to the studio audience before ending the show with her signature catchphrase, "Go home! Go home!" and dancing as the credits roll.  She chose the phrase "Go home," because she could not think of anything clever for the ending. Her closing monologue is, "Oh, you got sore bums.  Go home!"

Opening title sequence
George Clinton was hired to write and perform the show's funk-infused theme song, "You're Thinking Right". Brooks hired animation and graphic-design company Klasky Csupo to design the show's title sequence. It would become the studio's big break. In addition to handing the show's opening, they also produced the show's animated bumpers. The opening title sequence in seasons one and two followed a brief introduction by Ullman to the studio audience. For season three, however, the opening  was scrapped, and in its place, a live-action farce was used; Ullman pulls up to the 20th Century Fox lot in her car and hits a pedestrian. She attempts CPR in front of onlookers and revives her victim. She then rushes into the studio and meets George Clinton; a person tries to get her opinion on a costume; Paula Abdul attempts to go over choreography with her. Next, she visits the makeup room and greets her fellow castmates – this includes the Simpson family. She then looks at a pushpin board, and stills of that week's sketches are posted. Season four featured a title sequence similar to the first two seasons.

Ending
After four seasons, Ullman decided to end the show, stating that she was "constantly challenged and happily tortured by a unique group of people." She also thanked Fox "for letting somebody no one ever heard of do a show on a network that didn't exist." Brooks stated that The Tracey Ullman Show was "the hardest work any of us ever did, and we would have continued forever if she had wanted us to [...] I'm just glad I appreciated it as it was happening and not just in retrospect ... Tracey is one of the most talented people alive." The show earned Fox its first Emmy Award, racking up a total of 13 nominations, and garnering four wins, by the end of its run.

Brooks did not mince words when  in 1992 that Fox chairman, Barry Diller, was announced to be stepping down. "I thought The Tracey Ullman Show should have stayed on as long as she wanted to do it." Diller had been dragging his feet in renewing the show. Tired of waiting, Ullman decided to pull the plug herself. When Ullman and the show won at the 1990 Emmy Awards, newspaper critics hailed: "Tracey Ullman Gets Last Laugh."  Later, Ullman admitted that she would have liked an additional year to try out all the characters she wanted to play. She was proud, though, of what they achieved: "no compromises, no giving up, always wanting the best."

Cast and crew
Cast

Tracey Ullman
Julie Kavner
Dan Castellaneta
Sam McMurray
Joseph Malone
Anna Levine (Season 3)

Guest stars

 Paula Abdul
 Judith Barsi
 Mel Brooks
 Michael Cerveris
 George Clinton
 Clarence Clemons
 Glenn Close
 Tim Curry
 Fran Drescher
 Doris Grau
 Kelsey Grammer
 Matt Groening
 Marilu Henner
 Carole King
 Cheech Marin
 Andrea Martin
 Kellie Martin
 Steve Martin
 Maureen McGovern
 Frank Patterson
 Matthew Perry
 Jim Piddock
 Billy Preston
 Bill Pullman
 Keanu Reeves
 Cesar Romero
 Isabella Rossellini
 Nick Rutherford
 Martin Short
 Steven Spielberg
 Betty Thomas
 Michael Tucker

Writers

 Jeff Baron
 Manny Basanese
 Jerry Belson
 Tony Berg
 Dick Blasucci
 Rob Bragin
 Holly Holmberg Brooks
 James L. Brooks 
 Dan Castellaneta
 Cameron Crowe
 Ken Estin
 Paul Flaherty
 Marc Flanagan
 Kim Fuller
 Susan Gauthier
 Howard Gewirtz
 Matt Groening (The Simpsons shorts only)
 Paul Haggis
 Craig Heller 
 Susan Herring
 David Isaacs
 James P. Kocot
 Jay Kogen
 Debra Korbel
 Deb Lacusta
 Jane Lancellotti
 Michael Leeson
 Ken Levine
 Joseph Malone
 Harvey Miller
 Marilyn Suzanne Miller
 David Mirkin
 Heidi Perlman
 Ian Praiser
 Lisa-Maria Radano
 Michael Sardo
 Richard Sakai
 J.C. Scott
 Mike Short
 Guy Shulman
 Sam Simon
 Doug Steckler
 Miriam Trogdon
 Tracey Ullman
 Ellis Weiner
 Michael J. Weithorn
 Wallace Wolodarsky

Directors

 Ted Bessell
 Stuart Margolin
 Penny Marshall
 Sam Simon
 Art Wolff

Episodes

Recurring characters

Over the course of four seasons, Tracey Ullman played upwards of 100 characters; some were repeated, but not on a weekly basis. The show's supporting cast also had their own characters, usually playing opposite Ullman's, but sometimes in solo sketches of their own. The following is a list of recurring characters performed by Tracey Ullman, Dan Castellaneta, Julie Kavner, and Sam McMurray. They are listed in order of appearance.

The Downeys
Sara and Greg Downey (Ullman and Castellaneta) are two yuppies who care for their son Max (played by Nick Rutherford) only when they absolutely have to.

Kay Clark 

Originally from England, Kay (Ullman) works in Rhode Island for a paper-products distribution company. She is constantly the target of her co-workers and her boss Mr. Le Roy's (Castellaneta) practical jokes. Kay takes care of her invalid mother, to whom she talks frequently on the phone from work.

Dr. Alexander Gibson 
A psychiatrist played by Dan Castallaneta, many of Ullman's characters are analyzed by him (e.g. Kay Clark, Brenda, Kiki Howard-Smith).

Brenda 
A neurotic and ditzy valley girl and a patient of Dr. Alexander Gibson's, she is played by Tracey Ullman.

Francesca McDowell 
A 14-year-old girl (Ullman), she is raised by her father David (Castellaneta) and his partner William (McMurray).

Sandra Decker 
A faded Oscar-winning actress from the Golden Age of Hollywood, she is played by Tracey Ullman.

Tina and Meg
Tina (Ullman) and Meg (Kavner) are best friends and United States postal workers.

Kiki Howard-Smith
An Australian professional golfer, she is played by Tracey Ullman.

Ginny Tilman
Ginny (Ullman) is a bitter divorcée from Dr. Lawrence Tillman (Castellaneta), and a Beverly Hills proctologist. Lawrence goes on to remarry Meg (played by Isabella Rossellini). Ginny's sister Roz (Kavner), who is married to perpetually unenthusiastic Leonard (McMurray), cares for their mother.

Summer Storm
A burned-out hippie disc jockey. 

Gulliver Dark
A lounge singer played by Sam McMurray, Gulliver's fans, consisting mainly of middle-aged women, become "Dark Ladies" once they have watched him perform 1,000 times or more, and have given him gifts equal to 10% of their income. Gulliver is nicknamed "The Velvet Bulge". The character went on to appear in The Simpsons, voiced by both Sam McMurray and George Balmaseda.

Angel and Marty Tish 
Angel and Marty (Ullman and Castellaneta) are a husband-and-wife duo, dubbing themselves "America's Sweethearts".

Margaret/Hans Neeman
Psychiatrist and mentor to Dr. Alexander Gibson, she is played by Tracey Ullman. Margaret reunites with her former student, Dr. Gibson, as a patient, and admits to having been a fraud;  she later returns in a second sketch after having transitioned into Hans.

Gigi
A woman, played by Tracey Ullman, she is put through the paces no matter where she goes (e.g. a job interview where she is given 60 seconds to come up with an elaborate tap dance routine,  and a therapy session where she is forced to figure out who is the therapist and who is patient).

The Sours
Gary and Joanie Sours, a newlywed couple, are played by Sam McMurray and Tracey Ullman.

Maria
A Hispanic maid played by Tracey Ullman.

Ann B. Cooper
A cat lady, played by Tracey Ullman, Ann is on the McDowell's co-op apartment's board of directors and is responsible for getting their application accepted.

Rosaria and Big Tony Manetti
Rosaria (Ullman) and her husband, Big Tony (played by Robert Costanzo) are an Italian-American couple who live in Jersey City, who constantly argue with one another.

Miranda Kenton 
A very self-involved Hollywood actress, she is played by Tracey Ullman.

Animated segmentsThe Tracey Ullman Show regularly featured short, animated cartoons as interstitials in the first three seasons.

Dr. N!Godatu
"Dr. N!Godatu" was a series of animated shorts created by M.K. Brown, and animated by Klasky-Csupo.  It was seen during season one only, and was the first cartoon seen on Ullman's show.  The shorts followed the somewhat surreal life of Dr. Janice N!Godatu, who calmly and cheerfully addressed the camera as she detailed her latest misadventure.  The character was voiced by Julie Payne.

The feature appeared in the first two Ullman episodes, then alternated more-or-less every other week with the "Simpsons" shorts (see below).  After appearing six times, Dr. N!Godatu was dropped at the conclusion of the first season.  Two additional "Dr. N!Godatu" cartoons that were prepared for the show never aired.

"The Simpsons"

The Simpson family debuted in short animated cartoons on The Tracey Ullman Show, beginning with episode three of the first season.  The shorts originally were presented on an occasional basis, alternating episodes with  "Dr. N!Godatu", but the reaction to the Simpsons shorts was very positive, and after appearing seven times during season one, the feature was quickly promoted to full-time status, appearing in every episode of seasons two and three, before being spun off into a half-hour series. These shorts, also called "bumpers", aired before and after commercial breaks during the first and second seasons of the show. They eventually had their own full segments  between the live-action segments during season three. Except for a repeat airing of the short "Simpson Xmas", they did not appear in the fourth and final season of The Tracey Ullman Show, as they had their own half-hour TV series by then.

All of them were written by Matt Groening and animated at Klasky Csupo by a team of animators consisting of David Silverman, Wes Archer, and Bill Kopp. Tracey Ullman Show cast members Dan Castellaneta and Julie Kavner provided the voices of Homer Simpson and Marge Simpson, respectively.  In the beginning, the drawings appeared very crude because the animators were more or less just tracing over Groening's storyboards, but as the series developed, so did the designs and layouts of the characters and the "Simpsons drawing style" was ultimately conceived. This style evolved even more throughout the first few seasons of The Simpsons, and was used more than a decade later on Futurama, another animated series created by Groening.

Reception

Critical response
While the show was a critical darling, it was never a ratings juggernaut; although none of the early newly launched primetime Fox network shows generated a significant return (Fox did not crack the top 30 in the Nielsen ratings until 1990 with The Simpsons). On the show's ratings, Fox president Jamie Kellner was quoted in 1988 as saying, "We're too new new to be discouraged by ratings [...] It's true that it's harder to discover Tracey on Fox than on NBC." As critic Howard Rosenberg of The Los Angeles Times and The Washington Post pointed out, though, it was probably easier for her to survive, as the show she was producing was probably too "rule-bending" for NBC to be interested in, in the first place.

The show faced practical obstacles reaching viewers, one of which was the network broadcasting via UHF signal in many areas. Ullman was personally critical of Fox messing with the show's timeslot, something network chairman Barry Diller later conceded. "I think there was real anger about the shifting time a lot, and that it was legitimate. Networks do many things that are not necessarily in the interests of a particular show, and those things are not always smart. We had a very large audience for a very special show-but it wasn't large enough. Certain things take time. As the world speeds up, the rhythm of this show will become consistent with the rhythm of the audience. But it might take 10 years. I think the 80-something shows they did will be like The Honeymooners. I don't know when. But it's going to be pure, driven gold. We expect to get every nickel back. Plus, plus, plus." "It should've been on Sunday night. I think a great lineup would've been The Simpsons followed by Tracey, on Sunday night.", said Matt Groening in 1991. Despite its issues in the ratings, the show retained a devoted fan base and became a cult hit up until the end. It also helped the Fox network gain credibility within the industry. Married... with Children, the series that launched the same night as the Ullman show, was mired in controversy and soon became branded low-brow humor.

Accolades

The show won a total of 10 Primetime Emmy Awards including Outstanding Variety, Music or Comedy Program in 1989 and 1990,  and Outstanding Individual Performance in a Variety or Music Program in 1990. Also in 1989, choreographer Paula Abdul won the Primetime Emmy Award for Outstanding Choreography for her work on the show.

Distribution
International
When The Tracey Ullman Show first appeared in Ullman's native England, the BBC decided to cut six minutes from the show, specifically the Simpsons shorts. "The BBC said the only thing they didn't like about the show was those weird little animated characters and suggested maybe they could get rid of them because they would never catch on," recalled Ullman. Despite their aversion to the cartoon shorts, she attempted to convince the broadcaster to buy the rights to The Simpsons television series, telling them it would be a mistake not to; Sky ended up buying the show. The Tracey Ullman Show aired on BBC Two in the UK, Network 10 in Australia and TVNZ in New Zealand.

Syndication
Reruns of the show appeared on Lifetime and Comedy Central throughout the 1990s in the United States.

Home media
, The Tracey Ullman Show has never been commercially released through any home media platform. In in an interview from 2017, Tracey Ullman theorized that music clearance issues may be the reason for this. A selection of the Simpsons shorts was released from 1997 through 1999 on The Simpsons VHS home video releases. The first Simpsons short called "Good Night" was included as a special feature on The Simpsons: The Complete First Season DVD box set released on September 25, 2001. The sketch "Due Dilligence" featuring actor-comedian Mel Brooks was released as an extra on The Incredible Mel Brooks: An Irresistible Collection of Unhinged Comedy'' DVD in 2012.

Notes

References

Further reading

External links
 
 
 

 

1987 American television series debuts
1990 American television series endings
1980s American sketch comedy television series
1980s American variety television series
1990s American sketch comedy television series
1990s American variety television series
1980s American LGBT-related comedy television series
1990s American LGBT-related comedy television series
American television series with live action and animation
English-language television shows
Fox Broadcasting Company original programming
Primetime Emmy Award for Outstanding Variety Series winners
Television series by 20th Century Fox Television
Television series by Gracie Films
The Simpsons
Tracey Ullman